Cronan is an Irish surname  derived from the word "cron" which meant "brown" or "dark."

Notable people 
Saint Cronan (Died 640), Abbot-bishop and patron of the diocese of Roscrea
John P. Cronan, American attorney and federal district judge
Michael Patrick Cronan (1951–2013), American graphic designer and artist
Rich Cronin, American musician
Selma Cronan (1913 – 2002), American aviator
Thomas Cronan, American athlete
William P. Cronan, Governor of Guam
William S. Cronan, American Medal of Honor recipient

See also
Cronin, surname

References